Bałtyk is an office building in the Jeżyce area of Poznań, Poland, designed by the Rotterdam-based MVRDV architectural studio.

Completed in May 2017, it stands at 67 m (220 ft) tall. It is the 5th tallest building in Poznań. The name of the high-rise references the cinema that existed in its location from 1929 to 2002. The building features setbacks and protruding window frames, which cause it to look different from every angle. Its design was inspired by the Pushed Slab office block in Paris, France, the DNB Bank Headquarters in Oslo, Norway, and Okrąglak in Poznań.

Gallery

References

Office buildings completed in 2017
Skyscrapers in Poland
2017 establishments in Poland